The 2004 Vuelta a Andalucía was the 50th edition of the Vuelta a Andalucía (Ruta del Sol) cycle race and was held on 15 February to 19 February 2004. The race started in Huelva and finished in Almería. The race was won by Juan Carlos Domínguez.

Teams
Thirteen teams of eight riders started the race:

 
 
 
 
 
 
 Cafés Baqué

General classification

References

Vuelta a Andalucia
Vuelta a Andalucía by year
2004 in Spanish sport